Hilda Stewart Reid (30 November 1898 – 24 April 1982) was an English novelist and historian. Her four novels, published between 1928 and 1939, are Phillida, Two Soldiers and a Lady, Emily, and Ashley Hamel.

Early life
Hilda Reid was the daughter of Sir Arthur Hay Stewart Reid, a judge in the Indian legal service, whose family had served in India for several generations. Sir Arthur and his father, Henry Stewart Reid of the Bengal Civil Service, were both born in India. Hilda Reid's mother, Agnes Imogen Beadon, was the sixteenth child of Sir Cecil Beadon, who was Lieutenant Governor of Bengal from 1862 to 1866. Hilda Reid was born in Lahore, then in India now in Pakistan. Her early childhood was spent in Lahore; she moved to England at the age of nine, where she was cared for by her mother's sister Irene.

Education
Hilda Reid took her undergraduate degree at Somerville College Oxford, where she was a member of a close-knit group of friends, several of whom went on to have distinguished literary careers. The group included Winifred Holtby, Margaret Kennedy, Vera Brittain, and Sylvia Thompson. Hilda Reid remained particularly close, personally and professionally, to both Winifred Holtby and Vera Brittain. In her autobiography Testament of Youth Vera Brittain describes how Winifred Holtby introduced her to "her friend Hilda Reid, the pale, whimiscal second-year student who has since become, as H.S.Reid, the author of exquisite historical novels, delicately etched with the fine pen of a literary drypoint artist". In her review of Hilda Reid's first novel in Time and Tide, Vera Brittain wrote: "To the generation that went down from Oxford just seven years ago, Miss H.S.Reid was known as an ardent and fastidious historical scholar, blissfully indifferent to the anxieties and rivalries of an examination system which offers little scope to an imagination so fine and so constructive." Brittain described Phillida in her review as "a rare and lovely book". In her review of Emily in The Schoolmistress, Winifred Holtby wrote: "Her two earlier books, Phillida and Two Soldiers and a Lady, were subtle and scholarly stories of the period after the Civil Wars. But in Emily she looks at the modern world, which is giving so much trouble to statesmen at Geneva. She looks and she laughs".

An article in Time and Tide, describing leading women writers who had emerged from Oxford after the first world war, described Hilda Reid as a Somervillian who "was thought much of as a poet by her college, a gentle, dreamy, delicate creature, with fair fluffy hair that would not keep tidy, and a reputation for brilliant and fastidious scholarship that won prizes but could not win alphas in examinations. She forgot lectures, roamed mildly between the Bodleian and Somerville, scattering books; and went down with a fourth in History. But this year when she published Phillida, an exquisite study of the seventeenth century – gay with polished wit and musical phrases, concrete and authentic and vividly imagined, those few who had read the uncommon promise of her frugal essays said 'I told you so. We knew that Hilda Reid could write'".

In the summer vacation during the first world war Hilda Reid, like other students, undertook agricultural war work. She picked strawberries which she described as "an agony of bending" and "pulled up flax with your bare hands. The Government did supply strong leather gloves, but they were in ribbons after the first 3 days. The flax was needed for making the fabric required for the cockpits and wings of aircraft".

Novels
 1928 Phillida (published by Chatto & Windus, London) 
 1932 Two Soldiers and a Lady (published by Constable & Co Ltd, London) 
 1933 Emily (published by Constable & Co, London) 
 1939 Ashley Hamel (published by Constable & Co Ltd, London)

Selected reviews
Phillida The reviewer in The Guardian wrote "Rarely have we been so taken with a story of adventure as we were with this chronicle of Richard Carey's thrilling Odyssey in Africa in the seventeenth century and of his belated love-affair with his Phillida." The reviewer of Phillida in The Times wrote: "Miss Reid contrives to write as a contemporary of the seventeenth century and of the twentieth century at once, and it is to this perhaps that the reader's pleasure is largely due. She is at home in the seventeenth century, and takes it so much for granted that we are soon persuaded to do the same." The review concludes: "If this is, as its publishers tell us, the early work of a young writer, it is remarkable as much for its performance as for its promise". The reviewer in Country Life wrote: "Though this seems to be Miss Reid's first novel, its strange elements are maturely compounded and her use of the seventeenth century idiom is natural and graceful". The reviewer in the Sunday Times wrote: "Phillida is a first novel of exceptional merit, and it should not be missed". The reviewer in the New York Herald Tribune wrote: "In this story, written in a style whose beauty is a certain crystal clarity and appositeness of phrase, a subtle transparence of word in which the underlying thought continually vitalises the changing external picture, the author has achieved an historical novel of peculiar charm and merit." The reviewer in the Liverpool Post and Mercury referred to Hilda Reid's confidence in the historical accuracy of Phillida: "She says she dare offer quite a handsome prize to anyone who can find in Phillida an error in historical fact, so assiduous has she been in her researches at the British Museum".

Two Soldiers and a Lady The reviewer in the Observer wrote: "Scene and costume are subordinated to character, for the interest one feels in Miss Reid's two soldiers and the lady whom they served is due to them individually and not their (Cromwellian) period". The review concludes: "The closely-knit, delicate texture of Miss Reid's story is as satisfying as her sense of character". The reviewer in Country Life wrote: "This is a rare book, rare in the historical knowledge and historical sense that informs it, and rare in the perception the reader gains from it." The reviewer in the Manchester Guardian wrote: "A graceful style and an intimate knowledge of seventeenth-century England are the outstanding features of Miss Reid's novel". The reviewer in the New York Times wrote: "The strength of the book lies in its abnegation. By deliberate concentration on what might, at first sight, appear to be historically of least importance the author has succeeded in reproducing the spirit of the period – which determined the events."

Emily The reviewer in the Daily Telegraph wrote: "Miss Reid must have been studying life in Bloomsbury, or Chelsea, or one of the more precious of our garden suburbs. The experience has diverted her thoughts for the moment from matters historical, and she has Produced 'Emily' for amusement – hers and ours. The cranks, the nut-eaters, the uplifters, the earnest remakers of post-war Europe are paraded in company with the most comic little group of Balkan intriguers London has ever sheltered". The reviewer in Time and Tide wrote: "It is a relief to come across a book so utterly joyous, irresponsible and deliciously mad as Emily." The Times Literary Supplement reviewer wrote: "Miss Reid has taken a holiday from the seventeenth century, and her new book is a modern extravaganza, very wittily performed". The reviewer in John O'London's Weekly wrote: "Miss H.S.Reid, whose amusing novel Emily has just appeared, went to Somerville College, Oxford, after first studying art. She worked as a nurse and as a schoolmistress before starting to write. She is an authority on witchcraft and village drama."

Ashley Hamel The review of Ashley Hamel in the Sunday Times described the novel as "a piece of very good work" which is "both lively and shrewd". It describes the novel as marking the changes, social, political, and ecclesiastical, in a Dorsetshire village from the 18th century to the present day. Ashley Hamel was also reviewed in The Times. The review includes: "Miss Reid is not a sentimentalist. She records changes without defending or decrying them, and after their moments of grief or joy her characters must insensibly resume the ordinary round". The reviewer in the Times Literary Supplement wrote: "It is a shrewd piece of work, gracefully carried out, and one takes great pleasure in the reasonable mind behind it". The reviewer in the Manchester Guardian wrote: "Miss Reid has a keen sense of the general ideas dominating English life at particular periods, and she is particularly successful with her eccentrics, such as Mr.Finch, the curate in charge in the days of pluralism, who, having conceived a boyish devotion to Marie Antoinette, holds himself partly responsible for her death because of his revolutionary opinions".

Other publications
1937 Famous Landscape Architects: Capability Brown (published in Landscape & Garden, the journal of the Institute of Landscape Architects, Spring 1937)
1938 One Hundred Years in a Chelsea Parish (published by Christ Church, Chelsea) 
1948 The Story of the County of London Branch (published by the British Red Cross Society)

A reviewer of One Hundred Years in a Chelsea Parish wrote that it is "an admirably written book, a model of a little history. Miss Hilda Reid has had not only books and the parish records and magazines for her material but personal memories of parishioners going far back into the nineteenth century. One of them has recalled for her a lady whose pony, after being un-harnessed from his basket carriage at the front door, walked up the steps and through the house to his stable in the garden."

The reviewer in the South London Observer of The Story of the County of London Branch wrote: "That story is told tersely, economically and factually by Hilda Reid, which recalls the nights of fire and explosion, particularly in south London". The reviewer in the Evening News wrote of the "heroic work" of the Red Cross nurses during the war years, and describes Hilda Reid as seeing "much of the organisation's work during the war years while working with the Civil Defence." The book carried a foreword by Mrs Winston Churchill.

Later life
Hilda Reid never married. During the Second World War Hilda Reid worked as an air raid warden in the Chelsea borough of London, where she lived at 46 Tedworth Square with her sister Lesley (who worked during the war at the secret cryptographic centre at Bletchley Park), and her mother Agnes Imogen Reid. After the war Hilda Reid wrote several unpublished novels and plays, and was for many years secretary of the Chelsea Society. Her unpublished novels include Tolpuddle House, Leaving Briarly, Thel, Egypt End, and Egremont. Her unpublished plays include The Jest of Fame, and The Burning Deck. Hilda Reid is the great aunt of author Anna Reid.

References

1898 births
1982 deaths
20th-century English novelists
20th-century English historians
Alumni of Somerville College, Oxford